Australian singer and songwriter Josef Salvat has released three studio albums, two  extended plays, and fourteen singles (including three as a featured artist).

Albums

Studio albums

EPs

Singles

As featured artist

Footnotes

References

External links
 
 
 

Discographies of Australian artists
Electronic music discographies
Pop music discographies